George Robinson was an American cinematographer.

Selected filmography

 Where Men Are Men (1921)
 Steelheart (1921)
 A Guilty Conscience (1921)
 No Defense (1921)
 The Silent Vow (1922)
 Restless Souls (1922)
 When Danger Smiles (1922)
 The Fighting Guide (1922)
 Playing It Wild (1923)
 The Steel Trail (1923)
 The Tie That Binds (1923)
 The Wrong Mr. Wright (1927)
 A Hero for a Night (1927)
 The Irresistible Lover (1927)
 Phyllis of the Follies (1928)
 Hoofbeats of Vengeance (1928)
 Stop That Man! (1928)
 Guardians of the Wild (1928)
 Wild Blood (1928)
 The Charlatan (1929)
 Plunging Hoofs (1929)
 The Harvest of Hate (1929)
 College Love (1929)
 Hell's Heroes (1929)
 La Voluntad del muerto (1930)
 Dracula (1931)
 East of Borneo (1931)
 The Homicide Squad (1931)
 The Spirit of Notre Dame (1931)
 Racing Youth (1932)
 The All American (1932)
 Once in a Lifetime (1932)
 Nagana (1933)
 Horse Play (1933)
 Her First Mate (1933)
 Love, Honor, and Oh Baby! (1933)
 Half a Sinner (1934)
 Cross Country Cruise (1934)
 Glamour (1934)
 Great Expectations (1934)
 Million Dollar Ransom (1934)
 Strange Wives (1934)
 I Give My Love (1934)
 The Poor Rich (1934)
 Gift of Gab (1934)
 The Mystery of Edwin Drood (1935)
 King Solomon of Broadway (1935)
 Mister Dynamite (1935)
 It Happened in New York (1935)
 Diamond Jim (1935)
 Chinatown Squad (1935)
 Three Kids and a Queen (1935)
 The Invisible Ray (1936)
 Postal Inspector (1936)
 Dracula's Daughter (1936)
 Easy to Take (1936)
 Parole! (1936)
 Sutter's Gold (1936)
 When's Your Birthday? (1937)
 Some Blondes Are Dangerous (1937)
 Night Key (1937)
 Carnival Queen (1937)
 Reported Missing! (1937)
 The Road Back (1937)
 You're a Sweetheart (1937)
 The Man Who Cried Wolf (1937)
 The Man in Blue (1937)
 Goodbye Broadway (1938)
 Sinners in Paradise (1938)
 The Road to Reno (1938)
 Wives Under Suspicion (1938)
 Young Fugitives (1938)
 Service de Luxe (1938)
 Little Tough Guys in Society (1938)
 Unexpected Father (1939)
 Son of Frankenstein (1939)
 East Side of Heaven (1939)
 One Hour to Live (1939)
 Charlie McCarthy, Detective (1939)
 Tower of London (1939)
 The Sun Never Sets (1939)
If I Had My Way (1940)
 The Son of Monte Cristo (1940)
 Treat 'Em Rough (1942)
 Give Out, Sisters (1942)
 Behind the Eight Ball (1942)
 The Mummy's Tomb (1942)
 Eyes of the Underworld (1942)
 The Falcon Takes Over (1942)
 Top Sergeant (1942)
 Madame Spy (1942)
 The Great Impersonation (1942)
 Drums of the Congo (1942)
 Sin Town (1942)
 When Johnny Comes Marching Home (1942)
 Overland Mail (1942)
 It Comes Up Love (1943)
 Frankenstein Meets the Wolf Man (1943)
 Rhythm of the Islands (1943)
 Mister Big (1943)
 Captive Wild Woman (1943)
 Get Going (1943)
 Son of Dracula (1943)
 Ali Baba and the Forty Thieves (1944)
 Cobra Woman (1944)
 The Scarlet Claw (1944)
 Allergic to Love (1944)
 Gypsy Wildcat (1944)
 Murder in the Blue Room (1944)
 House of Frankenstein (1944)
 Destiny (1944)
 Here Come the Co-eds (1945)
 Sudan (1945)
 The Naughty Nineties (1945)
 House of Dracula (1945)
 Frontier Gal (1945)
 The Scarlet Horseman (1946)
 The Cat Creeps (1946)
 Idea Girl (1946)
 The Runaround (1946)
 She Wrote the Book (1946)
 Slightly Scandalous (1946)
 Linda, Be Good (1947)
 The Exile (1947)
 Slave Girl (1947)
 Heading for Heaven (1947)
 Open Secret (1948)
 The Challenge (1948)
 Blonde Ice (1948)
 13 Lead Soldiers (1948)
 Walk a Crooked Mile (1948)
 The Creeper (1938)
 The Vicious Circle (1948)
 Free for All (1949)
 Abbott and Costello in the Foreign Legion (1950)
 Abbott and Costello Meet the Invisible Man (1951)
 Tales of Robin Hood (1951)
 Comin' Round the Mountain (1951)
 Jack and the Beanstalk (1952)
 Lost in Alaska (1952)
 Ma and Pa Kettle on Vacation (1953)
 Abbott and Costello Meet Dr. Jekyll and Mr. Hyde (1953)
 The Yellow Mountain (1954)
 Destry (1954)
 Black Horse Canyon (1954)
 Ricochet Romance (1954)
 The Square Jungle (1955)
 Abbott and Costello Meet the Mummy (1955)
 Tarantula! (1955)
 The Toy Tiger (1956)
 Rock, Pretty Baby (1956)
 Dance with Me, Henry (1956)
 The Kettles in the Ozarks (1956)
 Francis in the Haunted House (1956)
 Gun for a Coward (1957)
 The Night Runner (1957)
 Joe Dakota (1957)

References

Bibliography
 Darby, William. Masters of Lens and Light: A Checklist of Major Cinematographers and Their Feature Films. Scarecrow Press, 1991.
 Hanke, Ken. A Critical Guide to Horror Film Series. Routledge, 2013.

External links

Year of birth missing
Year of death missing
American cinematographers
People from California